León Aillaud Barreiro was an Interim Governor of the Mexican State of Veracruz in the period from June 22, 1911, to December 12, 1911.

Early years 
Born in the city and port of Veracruz, in the year 1880. Did his primary school in his hometown and then studied keeping, to join various commercial houses.

The Mexican Revolution
In 1910, when he worked in the "Hardware Varela," began his involvement in the Liberal Club "Lerdo de Tejeda" next to veracruzanos young revolutionaries. Followed the timber movement and participated in organizing the welcome that was offered at the port of Veracruz to Francisco I. Madero. 

A waiver of the governorship of the State of Emilio Léycegui, given the bloody events that occurred, was appointed by the Legislature and Governor Local Constitutional Intergovernmental on June 22, 1911. 

During the following months, there was a great political turmoil and could only weather the storm as it existed before the Legislature an indictment of his predecessor Emilio Léycegui by the events and the need to investigate. 

She was entrusted by the President Madero, to convene elections, which were never carried out, such was the anger of Madero made the Legislature removed it Local, which sent the General Angel Garcia Pena hundred federal soldiers and remove protect the official enclosure. 

This caused his voluntary exile on December 12, 1911, ending his brief administration. He moved to the port of Veracruz and embarked bound for Havana, then to New Orleans, San Antonio and finally to El Paso, Texas. He returned to this country to fall into the regime of usurpation of Victoriano Huerta

1911 and 1912 Past Grand Master of the 33 Degree in the Unified Mexican Grand Lodge   

Son León Aillaud Neveu

References 
 everacruz.gob.mx
 glumver.org.mx

People from Veracruz (city)

1880 births
1936 deaths
Governors of Veracruz
Mexican people of French descent
Mexican people of Portuguese descent
Politicians from Veracruz